Oneida County is the name of three counties in the United States:

 Oneida County, Idaho 
 Oneida County, New York 
 Oneida County, Wisconsin

See also
 Oneida (disambiguation)